Yuliana Vanessa Bolívar Gonzáles (born 18 May 1990) is a Peruvian judoka. She won one of the bronze medals in the women's +78 kg event at the 2019 Pan American Games held in Lima, Peru. In her bronze medal match she defeated Nina Cutro-Kelly of the United States. She is originally from Venezuela.

In 2020, she won the bronze medal in the women's +78 kg event at the Pan American Judo Championships held in Guadalajara, Mexico. In 2021, she competed in the women's +78 kg event at the World Judo Championships held in Budapest, Hungary.

Achievements

References

External links
 

Living people
1990 births
Place of birth missing (living people)
Peruvian female judoka
Pan American Games medalists in judo
Pan American Games bronze medalists for Peru
Judoka at the 2019 Pan American Games
Venezuelan expatriate sportspeople in Peru
Medalists at the 2019 Pan American Games
20th-century Peruvian women
21st-century Peruvian women